The Syöksy''-class motor torpedo boats was a series of four British Thornycroft type motor torpedo boats of the Finnish Navy. The vessels were constructed in 1928 by the John Thornycroft & Co. shipyard in Woolton, UK. The vessels saw service in World War II. The Thornycroft type released its torpedoes by dropping them from rails in the aft. The ship then had to steer away from the torpedoes path, a manoeuvre that could be quite tricky in the close waters of the Gulf of Finland.

In 1942, the vessels received individual identification symbols on their superstructures. Nuoli had the ace of hearts, Vinha the ace of clubs, Syöksy the ace of diamonds, and Raju the ace of spades.

Combat history
On 6 July 1941 Syöksy and Vinha sortied to intercept a convoy of three sailing ships headed for Hanko. In heavy seas the torpedoes did not function reliably and the boats could not hit their targets. Instead Syöksy dashed past the lead ship and dropped its depth charges in front of it which exploded and sank the sailing ship. Both Finnish motor torpedo boats escaped unharmed before escorting Soviet ships could respond.

On the night of 19 and 20 July 1941 Finnish motor torpedo boats were patrolling of the coast of Estonia when a Soviet destroyer opened fire on them. Vinha was damaged and unable to move but Finns were able to tow it to safety while Syöksy made repeated torpedo runs towards the destroyer drawing its fire and distracting it.

On 1 September 1941 Syöksy and Vinha were patrolling south of the Beryozovye Islands when they came across a pair of Soviet freighters. Syöksy torpedoed and sank the lead merchant (SS Meero, 1,866 tons).

On 22 September 1941 Syöksy sank the Soviet minehunter T-41 (Kirov) east of Gogland while it was patrolling near the island with Vinha.

Vessels of the class
 Syöksy: Ex-MTV 4 in Finnish service. She was used as a torpedo boat until 1943, and then equipped with one 20 mm cannon and 3 mines.
 Nuoli: Ex-MTV 5 in Finnish service. She was used as a torpedo boat until 1943, and then equipped with one 20 mm cannon and 3 mines.
 Vinha: Ex-MTV 6 in Finnish service. She was used as a torpedo boat until 1943, and then equipped with one 20 mm cannon and 3 mines.
 Raju'': Ex-MTV 7 in Finnish service. She was destroyed on May 16, 1943, after having collided with a boom obstacle outside Koivisto.

References

Torpedo boats of the Finnish Navy
Torpedo boat classes